Helmut Janz (April 11, 1934 Gladbeck, Germany – November 19, 2000 Neu-Ulm, Germany) was a German track and field athlete.

He finished fourth behind an American sweep in the 400 metres hurdles at the 1960 Olympics. Later in the season he achieved a European record at 49.9. He was the West German champion at 400 hurdles seven times in a row (1957–1963). In 1963 he was awarded the Rudolf Harbig Memorial Prize. He ranked fourth at the Roma Olympics in 1960, but set a European record with 49.9. He was in the lead as he came down the stretch, but then Glenn Davis, Cliff Cushman, and Dick Howard, three Americans, passed him at the last hurdle, later calling it the most disappointing moment of his life. At the 1962 European Championships, he won a bronze after being disqualified in the second round.

References

1934 births
2000 deaths
West German male hurdlers
Olympic athletes of the United Team of Germany
Athletes (track and field) at the 1960 Summer Olympics
People from Gladbeck
Sportspeople from Münster (region)
European Athletics Championships medalists